Marina Pikalova (born 16 March 1985) is a Kazakhstani handball player for USC Dostyk and the Kazakhstani national team.

She competed at the 2008 Summer Olympics in Beijing, where the Kazakhstani team placed 10th.

She also competed at the 2015 World Women's Handball Championship in Denmark.

References

External links

1985 births
Living people
People from Shymkent
Kazakhstani female handball players
Olympic handball players of Kazakhstan
Handball players at the 2008 Summer Olympics
Asian Games medalists in handball
Handball players at the 2006 Asian Games
Handball players at the 2010 Asian Games
Handball players at the 2014 Asian Games
Asian Games silver medalists for Kazakhstan
Asian Games bronze medalists for Kazakhstan
Medalists at the 2006 Asian Games
Medalists at the 2014 Asian Games
21st-century Kazakhstani women